Lifted or The Story Is in the Soil, Keep Your Ear to the Ground is the fourth studio album by Bright Eyes and the 46th release of Saddle Creek Records. The band made its national television debut in support of the album, performing "The Trees Get Wheeled Away" (a track that was not on the album) on the Late Show with David Letterman.

The album was reissued by Dead Oceans alongside a six-track companion EP on November 11, 2022.

Critical reception

Lifted received positive reviews, ranking fourth on Rolling Stone'''s list of the best albums in 2002, and was lauded as a breakthrough album for Bright Eyes and Conor Oberst. Kludge included it on their list of best albums of 2002. Blender ranked the album at 52 on their list of "100 Greatest Indie-Rock Albums Ever", which appeared in the December 2007 issue.Lifted'' was the band's first to reach The Billboard 200, spending one week at No. 161. The set has sold 184,000 copies in the United States, according to Nielsen SoundScan. As of 2009 it has sold over 340,000 copies in the US.

Track listing

Personnel
Conor Oberst – guitar, piano, rhodes, organ, voice (tracks 1–13)
Mike Mogis – banjos, bells, hammered dulcimer, vibraphone, glockenspiel, mandolin, guitar, dobro, pedal steel (tracks 2–9, 11–13)
Matt Focht, Clint Schnase, Mike Sweeney – drums
Todd Baechle, Jenny Lewis, Blake Sennett, Choir – vocal harmonies
Andy LeMaster – electric guitar, keyboards, vocal harmonies (tracks 2–4, 6–8, 11)
Clark Baechle – drums, clarinet
Clay Leverett – drums, vocal harmonies
Jiha Lee – flute, vocal harmonies (tracks 3, 6, 8, 9)
Chris Brooks – piano (track 9)
Gretta Cohn – cello (tracks 3, 5, 7, 12)
Sean Cole – harmonica (tracks 9, 13)
Julee Dunekacke – French horn (track 3)
Margaret Fish – bassoon (tracks 3, 13)
Orenda Fink – trumpet, vocal harmonies (tracks 2, 3, 7, 11, 13)
Jason Flatowicz – trombone (tracks 3, 13)
Tiffany Kowalski – violin (tracks 3, 5, 7, 12)
Matt Maginn – bass (tracks 2, 4, 7, 9)
Casey Scott – bass (tracks 3, 8, 9, 12, 13)
Katie Muth – oboe (tracks 3, 6, 8, 12)
Ted Stevens – electric guitar (track 9)
Maria Taylor – piano, organ, vocal harmonies (tracks 2–4, 8, 12, 13)

Charts

References

External links
Saddle Creek Records

2002 albums
Bright Eyes (band) albums
Saddle Creek Records albums
Albums produced by Mike Mogis